Parliamentary elections were held in Bashkortostan on 9 September 2018 to elect the 110 members of 6th convocation of the State Assembly. The United Russia won majority of seats while the Communist Party and Liberal Democratic Party earned the highest gain of seats.

Electoral system 
In accordance with the Bashkir law, the State Assembly of Bashkortostan members are elected for a five-year term on the basis of universal equal and direct suffrage through a secret ballot by a citizen of the Russian Federation. A person may be eligible to be elected if they have reached the age of 21 as well as the right to vote. The State Assembly can function if at least 2/3's of its members have been elected.

Timeline 

 18 June 2018 – The Central Election Commission of Bashkortostan sets the election date for 9 September.
 10 July 2018 – Accreditation of mass media applications begin.
 21 July 2018 – Nominations of candidates end and registration begins.
 31 July 2018 – Registration of candidates end.
 5 September 2018 – Accreditation of media applications end.
 8 September 2018 – Day of silence, campaigning is prohibited. 
 9 September 2018 – Election day, 3,426 polls open at 8:00 and close at 20:00 where the tabulation and counting of ballots begin.

Results

References 

Bashkir